The 1976 Coupe de France Final was a football match held at Parc des Princes, Paris on 12 June 1976. Olympique de Marseille defeated Olympique Lyonnais 2–0 thanks to goals by Raoul Noguès and Saar Boubacar.

Match details

See also
Coupe de France 1975-76

External links
Coupe de France results at Rec.Sport.Soccer Statistics Foundation
Report on French federation site

Coupe
1976
Coupe De France Final 1976
Coupe De France Final 1976
Coupe de France Final
Coupe de France Final